Why Men Leave Home is a 1924 American silent comedy-drama film directed by John M. Stahl directed and stars Lewis Stone and Helene Chadwick. Produced by Louis B. Mayer and released through First National Pictures (then known as Associated First National), the film is based on the 1922 play of the same name by Avery Hopwood.

Plot
As described in a film magazine review, after a year of wedded life, John Emerson begins to neglect his wife Irene. A love affair develops between him and Jean Ralston, his office secretary. When John comes home after escorting Jean to and from a theater party, the scent of the perfume used by his charmer clings to John and awakens the wife's suspicions. Irene procures a divorce, and John marries the other woman. Later, Grandma Sutton succeeds in luring John and Irene under her roof, and with Dr. Bailey's aid has the place quarantined so that the pair cannot leave. The result is that the old love blooms once more. John's second wife gets a divorce, and he remarries Irene.

Cast

Preservation
A print of Why Men Leave Home is preserved by Metro-Goldwyn-Mayer.

References

External links

1924 films
1924 comedy-drama films
1920s English-language films
American silent feature films
American black-and-white films
American films based on plays
Films directed by John M. Stahl
First National Pictures films
Films produced by Louis B. Mayer
1920s American films
Silent American comedy-drama films